Waverly Fairgrounds or Waverly Park was the home of the Elizabeth Resolutes baseball club. The Resolutes participated in the National Association 1873 season, so Waverly is considered a major league ballpark by those who count the NA as a major league.

The park was located in a community called Waverly, which was bordered by Lower Road, Haynes Avenue, and Frelinghuysen Street.  The site is now split by Weequahic Park in Newark and B'nai Jeshuron Cemetery in Elizabeth.

The Resolutes played all of eight games at Waverly, all losses, during their forlorn 2–21 season.

References

External links
Retrosheet. "Park Directory". Retrieved 2006-09-04.

Defunct baseball venues in the United States
Buildings and structures in Essex County, New Jersey
Defunct sports venues in New Jersey
Elizabeth, New Jersey
Baseball venues in New Jersey